or  is a fjord in Troms og Finnmark county, Norway. The European route E8 highway follows most of the eastern shore of the fjord and the European route E6 highway runs along the southern end of the fjord. The village of Storsteinnes lies along the southwestern coast of the fjord and the village of Nordkjosbotn lies at the southeastern end of the fjord.

See also
 List of Norwegian fjords

References

Fjords of Troms og Finnmark
Balsfjord
Tromsø